The Pecheneg revolt was an uprising of the Pechenegs against the Byzantine Empire, which lasted from 1049 to 1053. Although the conflict ended with a negotiation of favorable terms with the rebels, it also demonstrated the deterioration of the Byzantine army. Its inability to defeat the rebels foreshadowed the future losses against the Seljuk Turks in the east and the Normans in the west.

Background 
In early 1049, the Byzantine emperor Constantine IX Monomachos decided to transfer 15,000 Pecheneg warriors from their positions in the Balkans to the eastern front. Upon approaching the Bosporus, however, they decided to turn back, and slowly marched through Bulgaria until they reached the Byzantine city of Serdica. They were soon joined by the followers of the Pecheneg warlord Tyrach, who was imprisoned in Constantinople, and the former Pecheneg tribal leader Kegen, and raised the banner of revolt.

Revolt 
The Pecheneg army soon began to plunder the area around Adrianople. The local doux (military commander) engaged the Pechenegs in battle, but was soundly defeated. Soon, Constantine decided to release Tyrach from prison on the condition that he pacify his followers. Predictably, he joined them instead. Constantine soon brought his eastern armies to the west, but they, under the command of Kekaumenos and Hervé Frankopoulos, were soundly defeated. At this point the Pechenegs were able to raid across Macedonia and Thrace with impunity. 

In June 1050, another Byzantine army under Samuel Bourtzes was destroyed by the Pechenegs. In this battle, the general David Arianites was killed and a veteran commander from Italy, Michael Dokeianos, was taken prisoner and also soon killed. At this point Constantine realized he had to change tactics in order to defeat the Pechenegs. He organized the formation of multiple counter-guerrilla units, largely made up of Varangians, Franks, and other Westerners, in order to counter the Pechenegs with their own tactics. For three years the guerrillas fought against the Pechenegs until, in 1053, Constantine was able to organize another regular army. This army, under the command of the doux of Bulgaria, Basil Apokapes, was also annihilated at Preslav.

At this point, the Pechenegs were tired of war and attempted to make peace with Constantine. A peace treaty was signed, which lasted for thirty years. The Pechenegs were forced to cede all of their conquests to the Byzantines, likely in exchange for some form of autonomy.

References

Sources 
 
 
 

1050s in the Byzantine Empire
1050s in Europe
1050s conflicts
11th century in Bulgaria
11th-century rebellions
Rebellions against the Byzantine Empire
Pechenegs
Medieval Thrace